Samantha Issabelle Roscoe (born 23 October 1995) is an Australian-British professional basketball player for TK Hannover of the Damen-Basketball-Bundesliga. She played college basketball in the United States for the North Dakota Fighting Hawks between 2013 and 2017 before splitting her time between Australia and Europe following college. She won an SBL championship with the Lakeside Lightning in 2018 and a championship in Bosnia in 2022.

Early life and career
Roscoe was born in Perth, Western Australia. While in high school at Newman College, Roscoe was on the cusp of pursuing a modelling career. As a 16-year-old, she was scouted by international modelling agencies. She ultimately chose to pursue a basketball career.

Roscoe played as a junior for the Stirling Senators in the Western Australian Basketball League (WABL). In 2011, she debuted for the Senators in the State Basketball League (SBL). She played 55 SBL games for the Senators over three seasons. In 2012 and 2013, she was member of the West Coast Waves' development squad. She was also named as a reserve for the Under 18 National 3 on 3 team that contested the 2012 FIBA 3x3 Under-18 World Championships in Spain.

College career
Roscoe moved to the United States in 2013 to play college basketball for the North Dakota Fighting Hawks.
She played sparingly for the Fighting Hawks as a freshman and sophomore, averaging 3.8 minutes across 35 games between 2013 and 2015.

As a junior in 2015–16, Roscoe played in all 33 games with 24 starts, averaging 9.0 points, 4.4 rebounds, 1.3 assists and 1.0 blocks in 23.7 minutes per game. She twice scored 22 points during the season, a career high. In March 2016, she hit a buzzer beater that made the ESPN Sports Center top 10 plays of the day.

As a senior in 2016–17, Roscoe was co-captain of North Dakota's 2017 Big Sky Championship team. She averaged 10.4 points, 5.0 rebounds and 1.7 blocks in 22.4 minutes in 30 games with four starts. She scored a career-high 20 points in January 2017.

Professional career

Australia
After graduating from North Dakota, Roscoe returned to Perth and played for the Lakeside Lightning of the State Basketball League (SBL) in the 2017 season. She was the league's blocks leader with 2.46 per game.

Roscoe returned to the Lightning in 2018, helping them win the SBL championship. She returned to the SBL grand final in 2019 with the Warwick Senators.

In 2021, Roscoe returned to Perth and played for the Kalamunda Eastern Suns in the inaugural NBL1 West season. The following year she had a four-game stint with the Warwick Senators during the 2022 NBL1 West season. She is set to return to the Kalamunda Eastern Suns for the 2023 NBL1 West season.

Europe
In November 2017, Roscoe moved to England and joined the Manchester Mystics of the Women's British Basketball League (WBBL) for the rest of the 2017–18 season. She averaged almost 10 points and six rebounds per game in her first season.

Roscoe continued with the Mystics in 2018–19 and 2019–20. In her third season, she led the Mystics with 18.5 points per game while averaging 8.5 rebounds per game.

For the 2020–21 season, Roscoe joined BG 74 Göttingen of the German Damen-Basketball-Bundesliga (DBBL). She averaged 15.1 points and 5.6 rebounds per game.

Roscoe continued in the DBBL for the 2021–22 season with TK Hannover. The team finished sixth and lost in the quarterfinals. In April 2022, she joined ZKK Play Off of the Bosnia and Herzegovina League for the team's finals campaign. She helped the team win the championship. 

For the 2022–23 season, Roscoe returned to TK Hannover and was appointed team captain.

National team career
In May 2019, Roscoe was named in an extended squad for the Great Britain national team. In November 2020, she made Great Britain's final squad for the EuroBasket qualifiers but did not receive any game time in their lone match.

Personal life
Roscoe is the daughter of Carole and Gary Roscoe.

Roscoe completed her master's degree at Manchester Metropolitan University.

References

External links

 TK Hannover profile
 FIBA profile
 North Dakota Fighting Hawks bio

1995 births
Living people
Australian women's basketball players
Basketball players from Perth, Western Australia
British women's basketball players
Centers (basketball)
Alumni of Manchester Metropolitan University
People educated at Newman College, Perth
Power forwards (basketball)
Sportswomen from Western Australia
University of North Dakota alumni